Lee Joseph Doherty (born 6 February 1980) is an English former professional footballer who played in the Football League for Brighton & Hove Albion.

Career
Doherty began his career as an apprentice at Arsenal, but never made a league appearance for the club. He moved on to Charlton Athletic in December 1998, but made no senior appearances before joining Brighton & Hove Albion three months later. He made his Football League debut on 20 March 1999 in a goalless draw away to Hartlepool United, and appeared twice more in Third Division matches, but was released at the end of the season. After a spell with Isthmian League club Chesham United, he signed for Crawley Town of the Southern League in January 2000. He continued his tour of non-league football in London and the home counties with clubs including Wealdstone, Ware, Bishop's Stortford, St Albans City, Grays Athletic, Fisher Athletic, Tooting & Mitcham United, Enfield, Molesey, Dulwich Hamlet, Walton & Hersham, Wembley and Leatherhead.

References

External links

1979 births
Living people
Footballers from Camden Town
English footballers
Association football defenders
Arsenal F.C. players
Charlton Athletic F.C. players
Brighton & Hove Albion F.C. players
Chesham United F.C. players
Crawley Town F.C. players
Wealdstone F.C. players
Ware F.C. players
Bishop's Stortford F.C. players
St Albans City F.C. players
Grays Athletic F.C. players
Fisher Athletic F.C. players
Tooting & Mitcham United F.C. players
Enfield F.C. players
Molesey F.C. players
Dulwich Hamlet F.C. players
Walton & Hersham F.C. players
Wembley F.C. players
Leatherhead F.C. players
English Football League players
Isthmian League players
Southern Football League players